St Thomas Rest Park, located in West Street, Crows Nest, New South Wales is the site of the first cemetery on Sydney's North Shore. It is the largest park in the densely populated Crows Nest area.

Cemetery

The land that now contains the St Thomas' cemetery site was granted, in 1821, to Edward Wollstonecraft. The land for the cemetery was donated to the Anglican Parish of St Leonards in 1845 by the prominent landowner and merchant, Alexander Berry, whose wife Elizabeth had inherited it on the death of her brother Edward Wollstonecraft.

Wollstonecraft had died in 1832 and was buried in the Devonshire Street Cemetery. His remains were later moved to a tomb constructed in the St Thomas' Cemetery by Alexander Berry for his wife. Berry was also later entombed there. The tomb is still standing in the grounds of the Rest Park.

In 1967 the Cemetery was handed over to North Sydney Council by an Act of Parliament granting the area as 'community land' and allowing its conversion from a cemetery into a Rest Park. The new park opened in 1974. The sexton's cottage, dating from around 1850, was restored and opened as a museum in 1985. Many monuments and headstones are located within the sandstone-edged historic precincts while others are scattered around the Rest Park. An interpretive history trail provides 24-hour access to historical information.

The cemetery contains one Commonwealth war grave, of an Australian Army officer, Capt. Richard Gordon Dibbs  The Park contains the headstones of thirteen members of four generations of the Dibbs family, the oldest being Sophia Elizabeth Dibbs, born in Sydney in 1809, and mother of George Dibbs. (grandson of George Dibbs, below) of World War II.

Notable people buried in St Thomas' cemetery 
 Robert Palmer Abbott, colonial politician and 5th Mayor of East St Leonards.
 Charles Badham, classical philologist
 George Barney, Royal Engineers officer, Lieutenant Governor of the Colony of North Australia, Surveyor-General of New South Wales
 Ellis Bent, colonial judge-advocate
 Alexander Berry and wife Elizabeth
 George Meares Countess Bowen, military officer and early colonial settler, and others in his family.
 Matthew Charlton, 1st Mayor of the Borough of Victoria.
 Rev. W.B. Clarke, rector of St Thomas church and "Father of Australian Geology"
 Thomas John Cook, 2nd Mayor of the Borough of Victoria.
 George Dibbs, premier of New South Wales in the late 1800s, prior to Federation
 William Dind, hotelier, theatrical manager and 3rd Mayor of East St Leonards.
 James Graham Goodenough, naval commander
 Hovenden Hely, explorer and politician
 Bernhardt Holtermann, gold miner, businessman, and politician.
 Isaac Ellis Ives, 39th Mayor of Sydney, 3rd Mayor of the Borough of Victoria, MP for St Leonards.
 Benjamin Jenkins, sea captain, owner of Don Bank, and 4th Mayor of St Leonards.
 Edward Lord, son of Simeon Lord, City of Sydney Treasurer, 2nd Mayor of East St Leonards.
 John Frederick Mann, explorer, member of Leichhardt's first expedition
 James Milson, pioneer, landowner and namesake of Milsons Point.
 Alfred George Milson, grandson of James Milson, 10th Mayor of North Sydney.
 Conrad Martens, artist
 Robert Moodie, 5th Mayor of the Borough of Victoria.
 Joseph Musgrave, bowler and 2nd Mayor of St Leonards.
 John Ovens, explorer
 William Tucker, 1st Mayor of East St Leonards.
 William Waterhouse, 7th Mayor of the Borough of Victoria.
 John Whitton, railway pioneer
 Edward Wollstonecraft, pioneer
 Montague Younger, musician

See also 

 List of cemeteries in Sydney
 List of parks in Sydney

References

External links

 
 St Thomas' Rest Park – Brochure. Retrieved 6 March 2014.
 St Thomas' Cemetery headstone search. Retrieved 6 March 2014.
 St Thomas' Cemetery – Walking Tour Brochure. Retrieved 6 March 2014.

Cemeteries in Sydney
Parks in Sydney
1845 establishments in Australia
Crows Nest, New South Wales
1974 establishments in Australia
Parks established in 1974